Sir John Phillips Rhodes, 2nd Baronet, DSO (19 July 1884 – 14 November 1955) was the son of Sir George Rhodes, a justice of the peace for Cheshire. He was chairman of Thomas Rhodes, cotton spinners and manufacturers and represented Stalybridge and Hyde in the House of Commons as a conservative from 1922 to 1923. He succeeded to his father's baronetcy in 1924. His wife, Lady Doris Rhodes, was a successful bridge player. His son was Sir Christopher George Rhodes, 3rd Baronet, a film and television actor.

References

External links 
 

1884 births
1955 deaths
Baronets in the Baronetage of the United Kingdom
Conservative Party (UK) MPs for English constituencies
UK MPs 1922–1923
People from Stalybridge
Companions of the Distinguished Service Order
People educated at Stubbington House School
Members of the Parliament of the United Kingdom for Stalybridge and Hyde